The Football Championship of the Moldavian SSR in football was a top competition of association football in the Moldavian SSR in 1940-91 soon after the Soviet occupation of Bessarabia and Northern Bukovina during the World War II in 1940.

The competition was organized based on Romanian clubs from Bessarabia (Kingdom of Romania) and Ukrainian clubs from the Moldavian ASSR that existed in 1924–1940.

List of champions

 1940 team of Chișinău
 1942-1944 Tournament Interrupted
 1945 Dinamo Chișinău
 1946 Dinamo Chișinău (2)
 1947 Spartak Tiraspol
 1948 Dinamo Chișinău (3)
 1949 Burevestnik Bender
 1950 Krasnoe Znamea Chișinău

 1951 Krasnaia Zvezda Tiraspol
 1952 Burevestnik Bender (2)
 1953 Dinamo Chișinău (4)
 1954 Institutul Agricol Chișinău
 1955 Burevestnik Bender (3)
 1956 Spartak Tiraspol (2)
 1957 Institutul Agricol Chișinău (2)
 1958 Moldavkabel Bender
 1959 ICȘ PVV Chișinău
 1960 Echipa orașului Tiraspol

 1961 Institutul Agricol Chișinău (3)
 1962 Universitatea Chișinău
 1963 Temp Tiraspol
 1964 Temp Tiraspol (2)
 1965 Energia Tiraspol
 1966 Stroiindustria Bălți
 1967 Nistrul Bender
 1968 Temp Tiraspol (3)
 1969 Politehnica Chișinău
 1970 Politehnica Chișinău

 1971 Pișcevik Bender
 1972 Kolhozul Lenin Edineț
 1973 Pișcevik Bender (2)
 1974 Dinamo Chișinău (5)
 1975 Dinamo Chișinău (6)
 1976 Stroitel Tiraspol
 1977 Stroitel Tiraspol (2)
 1978 Nistru Cioburciu
 1979 Nistru Cioburciu (2)
 1980 Nistru Cioburciu (3)

 1981 Grănicerul Glodeni
 1982 Grănicerul Glodeni (2)
 1983 Grănicerul Glodeni (3)
 1984 Grănicerul Glodeni (4)
 1985 Iskra Râbnița
 1986 Avangard Lazovsc
 1987 Tekstilșcik-2 Tiraspol
 1988 Tighina Bender
 1989 Tekstilșcik-2 Tiraspol (2)
 1990 Moldovahidromaș Chișinău
 1991 Cristalul Fălești
 1991–92 Speranța Nisporeni

See also
 Moldovan Super Liga

References

External links
 All Moldovan champions including Soviet at RSSSF

Moldavia
Soviet
1940 establishments in the Moldavian Soviet Socialist Republic
1992 disestablishments in Moldova
Recurring sporting events established in 1940
Recurring events disestablished in 1992
 
Moldavian Soviet Socialist Republic
Moldova